Kunik is a Jewish surname derived from the Yiddish "Kune" which means clan, family. Notable people with the surname include:

Matúš Kuník (born 1997), Slovak footballer
Ran Kunik (born 1968), Israeli politician and table tennis player

See also
Kunin (surname)

jewish surnames